Days of Hope is a BBC television drama serial produced in 1975. The series dealt with the lives of a working-class family from the turmoils of the First World War in 1916 to the General Strike in 1926. It was written by Jim Allen, produced by Tony Garnett and directed by Ken Loach.

Cast
 Paul Copley as Ben Matthews
Pamela Brighton as Sarah Hargreaves
Nikolas Simmonds as Philip Hargreaves
 Alun Armstrong as Billy Shepherd
Clifford Kershaw as Tom Matthews
 Helene Palmer as Martha Matthews
Gary Roberts as Joel Barnett
Jean Spence as May Barnett
Christine Anderson as Jenny Barnett
 John Phillips as Josiah Wedgwood
 Stephen Rea as Reporter

Episodes

Box-set and certification
Days of Hope is included on the Ken Loach at the BBC DVD box-set released in 2011.

The first two episodes of the series were given 15 certificates: the first episode for strong language, and the second for strong language and moderate violence. Episodes 3 and 4 were given PG certificates.

Reception
The first episode of Days of Hope caused considerable controversy in the British media owing to its critical depiction of the military in World War I, and particularly over a scene where conscientious objectors were tied up to stakes outside trenches in view of enemy fire after refusing to obey orders. An ex-serviceman subsequently contacted The Times newspaper with an illustration from the time of a similar scene. In an interview, Loach said that numerous letters were written to newspapers about small inaccuracies (e.g. the soldiers' marching formations) but relatively few challenging the main narrative of events.

In contrast, the Marxist historian John Newsinger has argued that the final episode of Days of Hope was so concerned with historical accuracy about the General Strike that it had become "boring" and "a heroic failure".  He contrasts this with "the magnificent socialist dramas" in the first episodes, which were less concerned with historical accuracy.

Winston Churchill is portrayed relatively negatively in the series, which highlights his attitude towards the coal miners during the strikes of 1921 and 1926. Ken Loach said in an interview that the media were particularly offended by a line that compared Churchill to a vulture and Lenin to an eagle.

References

External links
 
BFI Film & TV Database
 British Film Institute Screen Online
 Senses of Cinema review and history

1975 British television series debuts
1975 British television series endings
1975 television plays
1970s British drama television series
Plays by Jim Allen
BBC television dramas
1970s British television miniseries
Films about Quakers
Television series set in the 20th century
English-language television shows
Television controversies in the United Kingdom